Wilfried Thurner (27 December 1927 – 28 September 1981) was an Austrian bobsledder who competed in the 1950s. Competing in two Winter Olympics, he earned his best finish of seventh in the four-man event at Cortina d'Ampezzo in 1956.

References
1952 bobsleigh two-man results
1952 bobsleigh four-man results
Bobsleigh four-man result: 1948-64

External links
  

Austrian male bobsledders
Bobsledders at the 1952 Winter Olympics
Bobsledders at the 1956 Winter Olympics
Olympic bobsledders of Austria
1927 births
1981 deaths